Enrique C. Basadre Stevenson (1848 – February 22, 1925) was a Peruvian physician and politician He was born in Tacna, Peru and graduated from the University of San Marcos. Stevenson served as minister of the interior (November 1910 – August 1911) in the Government of Peru and was Prime Minister of Peru (December 1910 – August 31, 1911) under President Augusto B. Leguía y Salcedo. He was a member of the Senate of Peru (1920–1925). Stevenson died in Lima, Peru.

Bibliography
 Basadre, Jorge: Historia de la República del Perú. 1822 - 1933, Octava Edición, corregida y aumentada. Tomo 10. Editada por el Diario "La República" de Lima y la Universidad "Ricardo Palma". Impreso en Santiago de Chile, 1998.
 Guerra, Margarita: Historia General del Perú. La República Aristocrática. Tomo XI. Primera Edición. Editor Carlos Milla Batres. Lima, Perú, 1984. Depósito Legal: B. 22436-84 (XI).
 Tauro del Pino, Alberto: Enciclopedia Ilustrada del Perú. Tercera Edición. Tomo 2. ANG/BED.  Lima, PEISA, 2001. 
 UNMSM (publicaciones): La Universidad Mayor de San Marcos y los sanmarquinos durante y después de la guerra con Chile 

1848 births
1925 deaths
People from Tacna
19th-century Peruvian physicians
National University of San Marcos alumni
Peruvian Ministers of Interior
Members of the Senate of Peru
20th-century Peruvian physicians